Phadnavis was an important administrative position in the administration of medieval Maharashtra, where they were finance ministers.

Notable people include:
Nana Phadnavis, who was a finance minister and de facto ruler of Maratha empire in the reign of Sawai Madhavrao Peshwa.
Devendra Phadnavis  , 18th Chief Minister of Maharashtra state in India
Shobha Phadnavis, member of Maharashtra Legislative Council and a former minister in Government of Maharashtra in India

References 

Surnames
Maharashtra
Marathi families
Indian names